NADH2 dehydrogenase (ubiquinone) may refer to:

 NADH dehydrogenase
 NADH:ubiquinone reductase (non-electrogenic)